An episcopal subsidy is the term for the various ways in which parish churches support their bishop and dioceses within churches with a system of episcopal government.

In the Roman Catholic church there are a number of forms of episcopal subsidy including the cathedraticum (an annual fixed sum) and the seminaristicum which is the fee for covering the expenses of seminarians.

References

Catholic Church and finance